Wolfgang Busch (born November 6, 1955 in Heppenheim, Germany) is a two time Humanitarian award winner, was inducted into the Queens Business Hall of Fame for his company Art From The Heart Films, was inducted into the LGBT Hall of Fame and is a multiple award winning documentary filmmaker, director, producer, cinematographer and editor, including a humanitarian award for his documentary How Do I Look. He also received a "Keep The Dream Alive" Martin Luther King Humanitarian award for his social and artistic activism for the Black and Hispanic LGBT (Lesbian, Gay, Bisexual and Transgender) Ballroom community, aka Harlem Drag Ball community.

He is an entrepreneur, grass-root organizer, motivator, inspirational and touches people life's from all walks of life. His Art In Education Documentaries are screened worldwide. He lectures about Artistic Empowerment and HIV/AIDS education at the most prestigious universities, Yale, NYU, Penn State, not for profit organizations The Door, LGBT Community Center in New York City and Chicago, the Gay Mens Health Crisis, community-based organizations and Churches across the United States; London, Amsterdam, Paris and Berlin.

History
Founder of Art From The Heart LLC in 2006, a video production company for trend setting under-served communities, producing Historic Art documentaries for the LGBT (Lesbian, Gay, Bisexual and Transgender) community and people with disabilities in the performing arts, The Special Needs Color Guard of America.. His up-coming release is about the New York City Rock Live Music Scenes during the 1980s and 1990s and its evolution.

Early life and career
Wolfgang has served on the Boards of MetroBears, Outmusic, All Out Arts, MCAANY (Metropolitan Community Athletic Association NY),
Manhattan Neighborhood Network and C. Virginia Field, Manhattan Borough President's Gay and Lesbian advisory council.

From 1990-2000 he produced New York New Rock, a weekly TV show highlighting cultural and educational aspects of various communities such as the local New York City Rock and R & B communities, LGBT, arts, sports, politics and fashion reaching 500,000 Manhattan households. The show was a successful outreach tool for artists and not for profit organizations and Busch was able to sign national and international record and licensing deals for several artists. As an openly gay artist, he has been embraced by a wide range of LGBT organizations to produce high level events including GLAMA (The Gay and Lesbian American Music Awards), SAGE (Senior Action in a Gay Environment) Lifetime Achievement Awards ceremonies and events for LifeBeat, Center For the Media Arts and Gay and Lesbian Community Services Center.

Busch's video production work can be seen on Film, the After Stonewall documentary, CBS, MTV, PBS, CNBC, E channel, New York 1, on the Internet and on the Island of Bermuda and Jamaica.

Busch's company Art From The Heart Films was inducted into the Best Gay & Lesbian Business in Queens, NY for six consecutive years and Busch has received numerous awards: Martin Luther King Jr. Keep The Dream Alive Humanitarian Award, Gay City News Impact Award, The A-List Award from Schneps Media, Best Documentary, Communicator Award, director for the "NY / Tokyo Youth Baseball Sister, City Exchange Program", sponsored by the United Nations and the Mayors office, Draco Editing Award, for the MTV music video of the band "Sum", Live Audio for the Ace Award winning Gospel TV show "Gospel Today", Mikie Award for sound and lights at the Pines and Cherry Grove, Fire Island Arts Project, Camera for the Emmy Award Winning Series on PBS for Sterling Films, Volunteer of the Year by the Gay & Lesbian Community Center and the Dedicated Service Award from Metropolitan Community Athletic Association of NY.

After having spent many years filming footage of the ball scene, Busch released in 2006 his first feature-length documentary How Do I Look, which was about the Harlem house ball community, the originators of the dance "Vogue" (see also ball culture).

See also
 LGBT culture in New York City

References

External links

How Do I Look NYC, 2006 Website for Wolfgang Busch's documentary on the ballroom scene as it has evolved since Jennie Livingston's Paris is Burning (1990). Wolfgang's new release is [Flow Affair; *http://www.FlowAffair.org], 2011 which is about the New York City and San Francisco flagging and fanning dance community with the origin in the gay leather bars in the late 1970s in New York City.

American documentary film directors
Living people
LGBT film directors
German gay men
German emigrants to the United States
People from Bergstraße (district)
1955 births